Can't Stop the Music is the sixth studio album and first soundtrack by Village People, for their movie Can't Stop the Music, released in 1980. Though the movie was a commercial failure, the album was more well received, reaching No. 9 on the UK Albums Chart, #47 on the Billboard 200 in the US, and #1 in Australia. The album was reissued on CD in 1999.

In addition to songs by Village People, the album also contains songs by David London and The Ritchie Family. The album also features a re-make of "Y.M.C.A.", which was actually the original 1978 recording with lead singer Victor Willis' voice removed and replaced by lead vocals from new singer Ray Simpson. Simpson's version was not released as a single and, hence, never charted. This is the first Village People album that was not certified Gold by the RIAA.

The album was the Village People's last official album for Casablanca. They would leave the label for RCA Records shortly after its release.

Track listing

Publishing controversy
On May 7, 2012, music publishers Can't Stop Productions and Scorpio Music failed in their attempts to prevent the rights for three songs written by Willis ("Y.M.C.A.", "Milkshake", and "Magic Night") from reverting to Willis as scheduled, starting in 2013. In a historic ruling, Judge Barry Ted Moskowitz of the United States District Court for the Southern District of California ruled that Willis could in fact terminate his copyrights granted to the publishers because "a joint author who separately transfers his copyright interest may unilaterally terminate the grant." In response to the ruling, Willis stated, "I am just looking forward to having control of the songs."

As a result, Victor Willis, per the court order, recaptured 33% of the copyright for "Y.M.C.A.", "Milkshake", "Magic Night", and other Village People hits. A year later, Willis' copyright share increased to 50% on 13 Village People titles, as the jury found that producer Henri Belolo was not a joint author of the lyrics.

Charts

Weekly charts

Year-end charts

Certifications

References

1980 albums
Village People albums
Casablanca Records soundtracks
Albums produced by Jacques Morali
Disco soundtracks